The 1995 NHL Entry Draft was the 33rd NHL Entry Draft. It was held at Northlands Coliseum in Edmonton, Alberta. The drafting order was now set partially by a lottery system whereby teams would not be guaranteed first pick if they finished last. Instead, a draft lottery was instituted in which the winner of the lottery could move up a maximum of four spots in the first-round draft order, meaning only the five worst teams, based on regular season points in a given season, could pick first in the draft, and no team in the non-playoff group could move down more than one place.  The Los Angeles Kings won the lottery, and thus moved up four spots from seventh to third. The last-place finishers, the Ottawa Senators did not lose the first overall pick through the lottery and picked Bryan Berard. This draft had the unusual distinction of having the first three selections be defencemen.  The top two picks swapped teams in trade the following year. The eligible player who arguably had the best NHL career, Zdeno Chara, was not selected.  He was drafted the following year.

The last active players in the NHL from this draft class were Jarome Iginla and Shane Doan, who both played their last NHL games in the 2016–17 season.

Selections by round
Club teams are located in North America unless otherwise noted.

Round one

Round two

Round three

Round four

Round five

Round six

Round seven

Round eight

Round nine

Draftees based on nationality

See also
 1995–96 NHL season
 List of NHL players

References

External links
 1995 NHL Entry Draft player stats at The Internet Hockey Database
 prosportstransactions.com: 1995 NHL Entry Draft Pick

Draft
National Hockey League Entry Draft